Richard Hubert Gordon Gilbey, 12th Baron Vaux of Harrowden (born 16 March 1965), is a British hereditary peer and crossbench member of the House of Lords.

He was elected to sit in the House at a crossbench hereditary peers' by-election in July 2017, in place of Lord Walpole who retired in June 2017. He made his maiden speech on 17 October 2017 concerning the impact of Brexit on agriculture in Scotland.

He originally qualified as a chartered accountant and was Managing Director, Corporate Development for Sungard Data Systems from 2003 to 2016. He succeeded to the title on the death of his father, Anthony, the 11th Baron, and inherited the family seat, Rusco, near Gatehouse of Fleet, in the county of Kirkcudbrightshire.

References

1965 births
Living people
21st-century English nobility
Barons Vaux of Harrowden
Crossbench hereditary peers
Hereditary peers elected under the House of Lords Act 1999